XBIZ Awards are given annually to honour "individuals, companies, performers and products that play an essential part in the growth and success of adult films" and have been described by XBIZ publisher and founder Alec Helmy as being "born out of the industry's desire for an awards event that not only encompasses all facets of the business but one which presents it in a professional light and honors it with class".

Organized by the adult industry trade magazine XBIZ, the awards were first given in 2003. The award nominations are submitted by clients, and the winners are voted for by XBIZ staff, industry colleagues and participating organizations. The awards were originally created to recognize achievement in the online adult industry, but, in recent years, video categories have been added.

The XBIZ Awards in the adult film industry have been compared to the Golden Globes in the mainstream film industry. The 2010 XBIZ Awards were held in at the Avalon in Hollywood.

As of 2014, the number of specific award categories has expanded over the years to include more than 150 award categories. The award winners listed below are mostly for major award categories, but a more comprehensive listing of past award winners may be found in the "External links" section.

Achievement in Movie Production 
 2008: Paul Thomas

Acting Performance

Acting Performance (Female) of the Year 
 2010: Kimberly Kane, The Sex Files: A Dark XXX Parody (Revolution X/Digital Sin)
 2011: Kayden Kross, Body Heat (Digital Playground)
 2012: Jessie Andrews, Portrait of a Call Girl (Elegant Angel)

Best Actress – Feature Movie 

 2014: Remy LaCroix, The Temptation of Eve (New Sensations)
 2015: Carter Cruise, Second Chances, (New Sensations)
 2016: India Summer, Marriage 2.0 (Lion Reach/Adam & Eve Pictures)
 2017: Mia Malkova, The Preacher's Daughter (Wicked Pictures)
 2018: Penny Pax, The Submission of Emma Marx: Evolved (New Sensations)
 2019: Avi Love, The Possession of Mrs. Hyde (Wicked Pictures)
 2020: Maitland Ward, Drive (Deeper)

Best Actress – Parody/Comedy Release 
 2013: Allie Haze, Star Wars XXX, (Axel Braun Productions/Vivid Entertainment)
 2014: Riley Reid, Grease XXX: A Parody (X-Play/Adam & Eve Pictures)
 2015: Jessica Drake, Snow White XXX: An Axel Braun Parody (Axel Braun Productions/Wicked Pictures)
 2016: Riley Steele, Barbarella XXX: An Axel Braun Parody (Wicked Pictures)
 2017: Abigail Mac, True Detective XXX (Digital Playground)
 2018: Joanna Angel, Jews Love Black Cock (Burning Angel/Exile)
 2019: Joanna Angel, Dirty Grandpa  (Burning Angel)
 2020: Ivy Wolfe, The Rule (MissaX)

Best Actress – Couples-Themed Release 
 2013: Remy LaCroix, Torn (New Sensations)
 2014: Marie McCray, Truth Be Told (Skow for Girlfriends Films)
 2015: Maddy O'Reilly, The Sexual Liberation of Anna Lee (New Sensations)
 2016: Keira Nicole, The Swing Life (New Sensations)
 2017: Cassidy Klein, New Beginnings (Wicked Pictures)
 2018: Asa Akira, The Blonde Dahlia (Wicked Pictures)
 2019: Mona Wales,  Insomnia (Wicked Pictures)
 2020: Kristen Scott, Greed, Love and Betrayal (MissaX)

Best Actress – All-Girl Release 
 2013: Sheridan Love, Against Her Will (New Sensations)
 2014: Dani Daniels, The Vampire Mistress (Sparks Entertainment/Exile)
 2015: Carter Cruise, Lesbian Vampire Academy (Hustler Video)
 2016: Penny Pax, Lesbian Fashionistas (Adam & Eve Pictures)
 2017: Dana Vespoli, Lefty (Sweetheart Video/Mile High)
 2018: Brandi Love, The Candidate (Sweetheart Video/Mile High)
 2019: Stoya, Talk Derby to Me (Sweetheart Video)
 2020: Kristen Scott, Teenage Lesbian (Adult Time)

Best Actress - Taboo Release 
 2019 Gia Paige, The Jealous Brother (Pure Taboo/Gamma Films)
 2020: Alina Lopez, Bishop's Interview: An Alina Lopez Story (Pure Taboo)

Acting Performance (Male) of the Year 
 2010: Evan Stone, This Ain’t Star Trek (Hustler Video)
 2011: Keni Styles, Malice in Lalaland (Miss Lucifer Productions/Vivid Entertainment)
 2012: Tommy Pistol, Taxi Driver XXX (Sensuous Diamond/Pleasure-Dynasty/Exile Distribution)

Best Actor – Feature Movie 
 2013: Steven St. Croix, Torn, (New Sensations)
 2014: James Deen, The New Behind the Green Door (Vivid Entertainment)
 2015: Steven St. Croix, Wetwork (Vivid Entertainment)
 2016: Steven St. Croix, Wanted (Wicked Pictures/Adam & Eve Pictures)
 2017: Xander Corvus, The Preacher's Daughter (Wicked Pictures)
 2018: Charles Dera, Half His Age: A Teenage Tragedy (PureTaboo/Pulse)
 2019: Tommy Pistol, Anne: A Taboo Parody (PureTaboo/Gamma Films)
 2020: Seth Gamble, Perspective (Adult Time)

Best Actor – Parody/Comedy Release 
 2013: Seth Gamble, Star Wars XXX (Axel Braun Productions/Vivid Entertainment)
 2014: Seth Gamble, Grease XXX: A Parody (X-Play/Adam & Eve Pictures)
 2015: Tommy Pistol, Not the Jersey Boys XXX (X-Play/Pulse)
 2016: Ryan Ryder, Peter Pan XXX: An Axel Braun Parody (Wicked Pictures)
 2017: Tommy Pistol, Suicide Squad XXX: An Axel Braun Parody (Wicked Pictures)
 2018: Michael Vegas, How I Fucked Your Mother: A DP XXX Parody (Digital Playground)
 2019: Seth Gamble, Deadpool XXX: An Axel Braun Parody (Wicked Pictures)
 2020: Tommy Pistol, Love Emergency (Adam & Eve Pictures)

Best Actor – Couples-Themed Release 
 2013: Richie Calhoun, Love, Marriage, & Other Bad Ideas (New Sensations)
 2014: Derrick Pierce, Tuff Love (Wicked Pictures)
 2015: Xander Corvus, The Sexual Liberation of Anna Lee (New Sensations)
 2016: Tommy Pistol, Wild Inside (Vivid Entertainment)
 2017: Dick Chibbles, Forked (Adam & Eve Pictures)
 2018: Tommy Pistol, Ingenue (Wicked Pictures)
 2019: Tommy Pistol, The Weight of Infidelity (PureTaboo/Gamma Films)
 2020: Zac Wild, Greed, Love and Betrayal (MissaX)

Best Actor - Taboo Release 
 2019 Michael Vegas, The Jealous Brother (Pure Taboo/Gamma Films)
 2020: Tommy Pistol, Future Darkly: The Aura Doll (Pure Taboo)

Best Supporting Actress 

 2012: Raven Alexis, Top Guns (Digital Playground)
 2013: Skin Diamond, Revenge of the Petites (AMKingdom/Exile Distribution)
 2014: Riley Reid, The Submission of Emma Marx (New Sensations)
 2015: Jessa Rhodes, Second Chances (New Sensations)
 2016: Riley Reid, The Submission of Emma Marx 2: Boundaries (New Sensations)
 2017: Asa Akira, DNA (Wicked Pictures)
 2018: Kristen Scott, Half His Age: A Teenage Tragedy (PureTaboo/Pulse)
 2019: Joanna Angel, Talk Derby to Me (Sweetheart Video)
 2020: Kenna James, Teenage Lesbian (Adult Time)

Best Supporting Actor 
 2012: Xander Corvus, Horizon (Wicked Pictures)
 2013: Brendon Miller, The Dark Knight XXX: A Porn Parody,  (Axel Braun Productions/Vivid Entertainment)
 2014: Tommy Pistol, The Temptation of Eve (New Sensations)
 2015: Chad White, Second Chances (New Sensations)
 2016: Brendon Miller, Batman vs. Superman XXX: An Axel Braun Parody (Wicked Pictures)
 2017: Eric Masterson, The J.O.B. (Wicked Pictures)
 2018: Small Hands, Half His Age: A Teenage Tragedy (PureTaboo/Pulse)
 2019: Seth Gamble, The Cursed XXX  (Adam & Eve Pictures)
 2020: Brad Armstrong, Love Emergency (Adam & Eve Pictures)

Best New Starlet 
 2008: Bree Olson 
 2009: Stoya
 2010: Kagney Linn Karter
 2011: Chanel Preston
 2012: Jessie Andrews
 2013: Riley Reid
 2014: Christy Mack
 2015: Carter Cruise
 2016: Abella Danger
 2017: Lana Rhoades
 2018: Honey Gold
 2019: Karma Rx
 2020: Autumn Falls

Best Non-Sex Acting Performance 
 2013: JJ Hollyberry, Not Animal House XXX (X-Play/Adam & Eve Pictures)
 2014: James Bartholet, Not the Wizard of Oz XXX (X-Play/Pulse)
 2015: Jacky St. James, Second Chances (New Sensations)
 2016: Roy Karch, Love, Sex & TV News (X-Play/Adam & Eve Pictures)
 2017: Tom Byron, Not Traci Lords XXX: '80s Superstars Reborn (X-Play/Pulse)
 2018: Alec Knight, The Candidate (Sweetheart Video/Mile High)
 2019: Nina Hartley, Future Darkly: Artifamily (Pure Taboo/Gamma Films)
 2020: Nina Hartley, Girls of Wrestling (Sweet Sinner)

Affiliate Programs

Affiliate Program/Network of the Year 
 2003: Platinum Bucks 
 2004: Adult Revenue Service (ARS)
 2005: SilverCash
 2006: SilverCash
 2007: Lightspeed Cash
 2008: TopBucks
 2009: Brazzers
 2010: Pimproll
 2011: lollypop
 2019: CrakRevenue

Affiliate Program of the Year - Cam 
 2019: Flirt4Free

Affiliate Program of the Year – European 
 2011: AdultWebmasterEmpire (AWE)
 2012: AdultWebmasterEmpire (AWE)
 2013: PartnerCash
 2014: Manica Money
 2015: ReallyUsefulCash

Affiliate Program – Gay 
 2011: (tie) Buddy Profits and PrideBucks

Affiliate Program of the Year – Multi-Platform 
 2011: CECash
 2012: Gamma Entertainment
 2013: Gamma Entertainment
 2014: CECash

Affiliate Program – Porn Star 
 2011: FameDollars

Affiliate Program – Paysite 
 2018: Bang.com
 2019: Bang.com

Affiliate Program of the Year – Retail 
 2011: FN Cash (Fleshlight)
 2012: FN Cash
 2013: GameLink
 2014: Gamelink
 2015: Gamelink
 2016: AdultShopping.com
 2017: GameLink
 2018: AdultEmpireCash

Affiliate Program – Solo Girl 
 2011: TwistysCash
 2012: TwistysCash

Affiliate Program of the Year – Specialty 
 2011: Joanna Angel Bucks
 2013: GroobyBucks
 2014: MrSkinCash (MrSkin.com)
 2015: MrSkinCash (MrSkin.com)
 2016: MrSkinCash
 2017: MrSkinCash
 2018: iStripper.com
 2019: GroobyBucks

Affiliate Program – Studio 
 2011: Bang Bros (Bang Productions)

Affiliate Program – VOD 
 2012: AEBN

All-Black

All-Black Release of the Year 
 2012: A Touch of Seduction (Wicked Pictures)
 2013: Straight From My Heart (West Coast Productions)
 2014: Black Heat (Jules Jordan Video)
 2015: The Seduction of Skin Diamond (Devil's Film)
 2016: Black Panthers 4 (Lexington Steele/Evil Angel)
 2017: Big Black Wet Asses 14 (Elegant Angel)
 2018: The Black Out (Jules Jordan Video)

All-Black Series 
 2012: Big Ass Cheaters (West Coast Productions)
 2013: Club Elite (Elegant Angel)

All-Girl

Release of the Year – Feature 
 2012: Cherry (JewelBox Films/Digital Playground)
 2013: Girls With Girls (Abby Winters/Wicked Pictures)
 2014: The Seduction of Riley Reid (Devil's Film)
 2015: Alexis and Asa (Adam & Eve)
 2016: The Business of Women (Girlsway/Girlfriends Films)
 2017: Little Red: A Lesbian Fairytale (Girlsway)
 2018: Vampires (Girlsway/Girlfriends Films)
 2019: Fantasy Factory: Wastelands (Girlsway/Gamma Films)

Release of the Year – Non-Feature 
 2017: A Lesbian Romance 2 (New Sensations)
 2018: Angela Loves Women 3 (AGW Entertainment/Girlfriends Films)
 2019: Bare (Jules Jordan)

Series of the Year 
 2012: Budapest (Girlfriends Films)
 2013: Lesbian Seductions (Girlfriends Films)
 2014: Me and My Girlfriend (Girlfriends Films)
 2015: Women Seeking Women (Girlfriends Films)
 2016: Women Seeking Women (Girlfriends Films)
 2017: Women Seeking Women (Girlfriends Films)
 2018: Women Seeking Women (Girlfriends Films)
 2019: Showcases (Girlsway/Gamma Films)

 All-Sex 
 All-Sex Release of the Year 
 2012: Performers of the Year 2011 (Elegant Angel)
 2013: D3viance (Rock Star Entertainment/Adam & Eve Pictures)
 2014: Whale Tale 6 (Smash Pictures)
 2015: Meet Carter Cruise (Digital Sin)
 2016: Big Booty Tryouts (Elegant Angel)
 2017: Anal Beauty 3 (Tushy.com/Jules Jordan Video)
 2018: The XXX Rub Down 2 (Digital Sin)
 2019: Carnal (Wicked Pictures)

 All-Sex Series of the Year 
 2012: Seasoned Players (Tom Byron Pictures)
 2013: Pretty Dirty (New Sensations)
 2014: Pretty Dirty (New Sensations)
 2015: James Deen's 7 Sins (James Deen/Evil Angel)
 2016: Angela (AGW Entertainment/Girlfriends Films)
 2017: Anal Beauty (Tushy.com/Jules Jordan Video)

 Amateur/Pro-Am 
 Amateur Release of the Year 
 2012: Can He Score 8 (Bang Productions)
 2013: Amateur Coeds 18 (Homegrown Video)
 2014: Amateur College Girls 6 (Homegrown Video)
 2015: Homegrown Video 850 (Homegrown Video)
 2016: Homegrown Video Group Sex: The More the Merrier (Homegrown Video/Pure Play)
 2017: Girls and Their Boys 22 (Abby Winters/Wicked Pictures)
 2018: Adventures in Wife Sharing (Homegrown Video)
 2019: I Want to Be a Pornstar (Beginners Luck/ArchAngel)

 Amateur Series of the Year 
 2013 Fuck a Fan (Immoral Productions/Pure Play Media)

 Pro-Am Release of the Year 
 2014: Mother's Indiscretion (Forbidden Fruits Films/Exile Distribution)
 2015: Handjob Winner 18 (Immoral Productions/Pure Play Media)
 2016: Kayden Kross's Casting Couch (Airerose Entertainment)
 2017: Fuck a Fan 27 (Immoral Productions/Pure Play)
 2018: Canadian Sex Trip 2 (James Deen Productions/Girlfriends Films)

 Asian-Themed 
 Asian-Themed Release of the Year 
 2012: Superstar Showdown 6: Asian Edition – Asa Akira vs. Katsuni (Reality Blue Media)
 2013: I Am Asa (Pornstar Empire/Exile Distribution)
 2014: I Am Asa 2 (Pornstar Empire/Exile)
 2015: Kalina Ryu: Asian Fuck Toy (Darkko/Evil Angel)
 2016: Starfall (Darkko/Evil Angel)
 2017: Asian Fuck Machines (Jules Jordan Video)
 2018: Asia Noir 7 (Video Team/Metro)

 Asian-Themed Series 
 2012: Kamikaze Girls (Kamikaze Entertainment)
 2013: Hello Titty (Third World Media)

 BDSM 
 BDSM Release of the Year 
 2014: Get My Belt (Pornfidelity/Juicy Entertainment)
 2015: Maddy O'Reilly's Submission (Deviant Entertainment)
 2016: Shades of Scarlet 2 (Zero Tolerance)
 2017: Bound for Domination (Deviant Entertainment/Metro)
 2018: Whipped Ass 21: Masochistic MILFs (Kink.com/Jules Jordan Video)
 2019: Sex and Submission 2: Anal Bounty Hunter (Kink.com)

 Best Art Direction 
 2011: This Ain't Avatar XXX 3D (Hustler Video)
 2012: The Rocki Whore Picture Show: A Hardcore Parody (Wicked Pictures)
 2013: The Four (Adam & Eve Pictures)
 2014: Underworld (Wicked Pictures)
 2015: Wetwork (Vivid Entertainment)
 2016: Wanted (Wicked Pictures/Adam & Eve Pictures)
 2017: Storm of Kings (Brazzers)
 2018: Justice League XXX: An Axel Braun Parody (Wicked Pictures)
 2019: Fallen II: Angels & Demons  (Wicked Pictures)

 Best Cinematography 
 2011: Francois Clousot, Jake Jacobs and Mark Nicholson, Speed (Wicked Pictures)
 2012: Alex Ladd, Carlos Dee and Mason, Portrait of a Call Girl (Elegant Angel)
 2013: Jinish Shah – Revenge of the Petites (AMKingdom/Exile Distribution)
 2014: Alex Ladd, David Lord, Francois Clousot, Mark Nicholson and Paul Woodcrest, Underworld (Wicked Pictures)
 2015: Alex Ladd, Eli Cross and Nic Danger, Wetwork (Vivid Entertainment)
 2016: Alex Ladd, Marriage 2.0 (Lion Reach/Adam & Eve Pictures)
 2017: Alex Ladd and Barrett Blade, DNA (Wicked Pictures)
 2018: Half His Age: A Teenage Tragedy (PureTaboo/Pulse)
 2019: Abigail (Tushy)
 2020: Teenage Lesbian (Adult Time) 

 Best Editing 
 2011: Voyeur Within (Studio A Entertainment) Andrew Blake
 2012: Fighters (Digital Playground)
 2013: Spartacus MMXII The Beginning (London-Gunn Films/Miko Lee Productions/Wicked Pictures)
 2014: Underworld (Wicked Pictures) Scott Allen
 2015: Wetwork (Vivid Entertainment), Robert April
 2016: The Submission of Emma Marx 2: Boundaries (New Sensations), Eddie Powell and Gabrielle
 2017: Little Red: A Lesbian Fairytale (Girlsway/Girlfriends Films)
 2018: Half His Age: A Teenage Tragedy (PureTaboo/Pulse)
 2019: Abigail (Tushy)
 2020: Teenage Lesbian (Adult Time) 

 Best Music 
 2013: Revenge of the Petites (AMKingdom/Exile Distribution)
 2014: Grease XXX: A Parody (X-Play/Adam & Eve Pictures)
 2015: Not Jersey Boys XXX (X-Play/Pulse)
 2016: Wanted (Wicked Pictures/Adam & Eve Pictures)
 2017: The Preacher's Daughter (Wicked Pictures)
 2018: Agent 69 (Adam & Eve Pictures)
 2019: Invictus (Sssh.com)

 Best Scene/Best Sex Scene 
 Best Scene – Feature Movie 
 2013: Lily Carter, Lily LaBeau, David Perry, Mick Blue, Ramón Nomar and Toni Ribas, Wasteland (Elegant Angel)
 2014: Jesse Jane, Kayden Kross, Manuel Ferrara, Riley Steele, Selena Rose and Stoya, Code of Honor (Digital Playground)
 2015: A.J. Applegate and Mr. Pete, Shades of Scarlet (Zero Tolerance)
 2016: India Summer and Ryan Driller, Marriage 2.0 (Lion Reach/Adam & Eve Pictures)
 2017: Anikka Albrite, Mick Blue and Sara Luvv, Babysitting the Baumgartners (Adam & Eve Pictures)
 2018: Jessica Drake, Michael Vegas and Ryan Driller, An Inconvenient Mistress (Wicked Pictures)
 2019: Kenzie Reeves and Small Hands, A Trailer Park Taboo — Part  (Pure Taboo/Gamma Films)
 2020: Ivy Lebelle, Maitland Ward & Manuel Ferrara, Drive (Deeper) 

 Best Scene – Parody/Comedy Release 
 2013: Brandy Aniston, Dick Chibbles and Eve Laurence, Star Wars XXX (Axel Braun Productions/Vivid Entertainment)
 2014: Kendall Karson and Ryan Driller, Man of Steel XXX: An Axel Braun Parody (Vivid Entertainment)
 2015: Aaliyah Love and Tommy Pistol, American Hustle XXX (Smash Pictures)
 2016: Kimberly Kane and Ryan Driller, Wonder Woman XXX: An Axel Braun Parody (Vivid Entertainment)
 2017: Anissa Kate, Jasmine Jae and Ryan Ryder, Storm of Kings (Brazzers)
 2018: Abella Danger, Isiah Maxwell and Joanna Angel, Jews Love Black Cock (Burning Angel/Exile)
 2019: Romi Rain & Small Hands, Metal Massage (Burning Angel)
 2020: Jane Wilde, Kenzie Reeves, Kira Noir & Small Hands, 3 Cheers for Satan (Burning Angel)

 Best Scene – Gonzo/Non-Feature Release 
 2013: Chanel Preston and Nacho Vidal; Nacho Invades America 2 (Nacho Vidal/Evil Angel)
 2014: Bonnie Rotten, Jordan Ash, Karlo Karrera, Mick Blue and Tony DeSergio, The Gangbang of Bonnie Rotten (Digital Sin)
 2015: Adriana Chechik, Chris Strokes, Erik Everhard, James Deen, John Strong and Mick Blue, Gangbang Me (Hard)
 2016: Jesse Jane and Manuel Ferrara, Jesse: Alpha Female (Jules Jordan Video)
 2017: Ana Foxxx and Manuel Ferrara, Black Anal Asses (Hard X/OL Entertainment)
 2018: Abella Danger and Markus Dupree, Fucking Flexible 2 (Toni Ribas/Evil Angel)
 2019: Ginger Banks and Mick Blue, Cam Girls: The Movie (Evil Angel)
 2020: Bridgette B, Jax Slayer & Rob Piper, Bridgette B Spanish Fuck Doll (Evil Angel)

 Best Scene – All Sex Release 
 2016: Jada Stevens and Wesley Pipes, Interracial and Anal (Blacked.com/Jules Jordan)
 2017: Jon Jon, Riley Reid and Toni Ribas, What's Next? (New Sensations)
 2018: Ana Foxxx and Small Hands, Axel Braun's Brown Sugar (Wicked Pictures)
 2019: Joanna Angel, Ricky Johnson, Isiah Maxwell and Prince Yahshua, Joanna Angel Gangbang: As Above, So Below (Burning Angel)
 2020: Teanna Trump & Jason Luv, Blacked Raw V19 (Blacked)

 Best Scene – Vignette Release 
 2013: Riley Steele and Erik Everhard, In Riley's Panties (Digital Playground)
 2014: Jada Stevens and Kevin Moore, The Hooker Experience (Kevin Moore/Evil Angel)
 2015: Ava Dalush and James Deen, I Love My Hot Wife (New Sensations)
 2016: Dani Daniels, Luna Star and Johnny Sins, Let's Play Doctor (Brazzers)
 2017: Elsa Jean and Ryan Driller, All Natural Saints (Hustler Video)
 2018: Katrina Jade, Charles Dera,   Nigel Dictator and Tommy Gunn, Sacrosanct (TrenchcoatX.com/Jules Jordan Video)
 2019: Tori Black, Adriana Chechik and Derrick Pierce, After Dark (Vixen)
 2020: Jane Wilde, Emily Willis & Prince Yahshua, Disciples of Desire: Bad Copy – Bad City (Jules Jordan Video) 

 Best Scene – Couples-Themed Release 
 2013: Lucky Starr and Xander Corvus, A Mother's Love 2 (Hard Candy Films/Pulse Distribution)
 2014: Madison Ivy and Mick Blue, Hotel No Tell (Wicked Pictures)
 2015: Anikka Albrite and Tommy Gunn, Untamed Heart (Adam & Eve Pictures)
 2016: Riley Reid, Romi Rain and Xander Corvus, My Sinful Life (Dreamzone Entertainment)
 2017: Katrina Jade and Xander Corvus, The Switch (B. Skow for Girlfriends Films)
 2018: Gracie Glam and Ryan Driller, It's Complicated (Wicked Pictures)
 2019: Gia Paige and Tyler Nixon, Love in the Digital Age (New Sensations)
 2020: Abella Danger and Small Hands, Her & Him (Pornhub Premium) 

 Best Scene – All-Girl Release 
 2013; Jesse Jane, Kayden Kross, Riley Steele, Selena Rose and Vicki Chase; Mothers & Daughters (Digital Playground)
 2014: Anissa Kate and Ariel Rebel, Ariel & Lola: Pornochic 24 (Marc Dorcel)
 2015: Kayden Kross and Misha Cross, Misha Cross Wide Open (Manuel Ferrara/Evil Angel)
 2016: Carter Cruise and Jessie Andrews, Jessie Loves Girls (Sweetheart Video/Mile High)
 2017: Deauxma and Syren De Mer, Road Queen 35 (Girlfriends Films)
 2018: Aidra Fox and Tori Black, Tori Black Is Back (Lesbian X)
 2019: Janice Griffith and Ivy Wolfe, After Dark (Vixen)
 2020: Charlotte Stokely and Kenna James, Confessions of a Sinful Nun 2: The Rise of Sister Mona (Sweetheart Video)

 Best Sex Scene – Taboo Release 
 2018: Angel Smalls and Isiah Maxwell, My Big Black Stepbrother (Toni Ribas/Evil Angel)
 2019: Gia Paige and Michael Vegas, The Jealous Brother (Pure Taboo/Gamma Films)
 2020: Bridgette B, Ivy Wolfe & Tyler Nixon, The Rules (MissaX)

 Best Sex Scene - Clip Site 
 2019 Britney Amber, Kleio Valentien & Mark Rockwell, Britney and Kleio (ModelHub)

 Best Sex Scene – Virtual Reality 
 2017: Riley Reid, On Set With Riley Reid (WankzVR)
 2018: Bridgette B, The Wrong House to Rob (VR Bangers)
 2019: Domino Presley, Moving in, Putting Out (GroobyVR)
 2020: Adria Rae, Alex Blake, Gina Valentina, Lexi Lore, Maya Bijou, Taylor Blake & Tommy Gunn, Santa's Naughty List (WankzVR)

 Best Special Effects 
 2011: Bat FXXX: Dark Night (Bluebird Films) 
 2012: Top Guns  (Digital Playground)
 2013: Star Wars XXX (Axel Braun Productions/Vivid Entertainment)
 2014: Underworld (Wicked Pictures)
 2015: Apocalypse X (Digital Playground)
 2016: Saving Humanity (AMKingdom)
 2017: AI: Artificial Intelligence (Girlsway/Girlfriends Films)
 2018: Star Wars Underworld: A XXX Parody (Digital Playground)
 2019: Star Wars: The Last Temptation (Digital Playground)
 2020: Captain Marvel XXX: An Axel Braun Parody, (Wicked Pictures) 

 Comedy 
 Comedy Release of the Year 
 2018: Bad Babes Inc. (Adam & Eve Pictures)
 2019: Deadpool XXX: An Axel Braun Parody (Wicked Pictures)
 2020: Love Emergency, (Adam & Eve Pictures) 

 Content Provider of the Year 
 2003: Matrix Content 
 2004: Video Secrets 
 2005: Matrix Content 
 2006: Webmaster Central 
 2007: World Wide Content 
 2012: AdultCentro
 2013: AdultCentro
 2014: AdultCentro
 2015: Webmaster Central
 2016: AdultCentro
 2017: AdultCentro
 2018: AdultSexContent

 Couples-Themed 
 Release of the Year 
 2012: Love is a Dangerous Game (New Sensations)
 2013: Torn (New Sensations)
 2014: Orgy University (Vivid Entertainment)
 2015: The Sexual Liberation of Anna Lee (New Sensations)
 2016: The Swing Life (New Sensations)
 2017: Forked (Adam & Eve Pictures)
 2018: Unbridled (Wicked Pictures)
 2019: Love in the Digital Age (New Sensations)

 Line of the Year 
 2013: Romance Series (New Sensations)
 2014: Romance Series (New Sensations)

 Crossover Move/Crossover Star of the Year 

 2007: Joanna Angel
 2009: Tera Patrick
 2010: Sasha Grey
 2011: Riley Steele
 2012: Katsuni
 2013: James Deen
 2014: James Deen
 2015: Nikki Benz
 2016: Lisa Ann
 2017: Dani Daniels
 2018: Ela Darling
 2019: Stormy Daniels
 2020: Maitland Ward

 Crossover Female Star 
 2008: Stormy Daniels

 Crossover Male Star 
 2008: Evan Seinfeld

 Design Company 
 2003: Wyldesites
 2004: Wyldesites
 2005: Dickmans Design
 2006: Wyldesites
 2007: Wyldesites

 Design Studio of the Year 
 2008: Dickmans Design
 2009: Dickmans Design
 2010: Blue Design Studios
 2011: (tie) Dickmans Design and Wyldesites
 2012: (tie) AdultDesign and Zuzana Designs
 2013: Wolume Studios
 2014: Zuzana Designs
 2015: Zuzana Designs
 2016: Zuzana Designs
 2017: Zuzana Designs

 Director of the Year 
 Director of the Year – Body of Work 
 2009: Belladonna
 2010: Axel Braun
 2011: Lee Roy Myers
 2012: Robby D.
 2013: Eddie Powell
 2014: Axel Braun
 2015: Jacky St. James
 2016: Jacky St. James
 2017: Greg Lansky
 2018: Bree Mills
 2019: Bree Mills
 2020: Kayden Kross

 Director of the Year – Individual Work/Feature Release 
 2009: Will Ryder, Not Bewitched XXX (X-Play/Adam & Eve Pictures)
 2010: Brad Armstrong, 2040 (Wicked Pictures)
 2012: Graham Travis, Portrait of a Call Girl (Elegant Angel)
 2013: Graham Travis,  Wasteland (Elegant Angel)
 2014: Brad Armstrong, Underworld (Wicked Pictures)
 2015: Eli Cross, Wetwork (Vivid Entertainment)
 2016: Stormy Daniels, Wanted (Wicked Pictures/Adam & Eve Pictures)
 2017: Brad Armstrong, The Preacher's Daughter (Wicked Pictures)
 2018: Bree Mills
 2019: Kayden Kross
 2020: Bree Mills

 Director of the Year – Non-Feature Release 
 2013: Mason, Lexi (Elegant Angel)
 2014: Dana Vespoli, Girl/Boy (Dana Vespoli/Evil Angel)
 2015: Kayden Kross and Manuel Ferrara, Misha Cross Wide Open (Manuel Ferrara/Evil Angel)
 2016: Tori Black, True Lust (ArchAngel/Girlfriends Films)
 2017: Greg Lansky, Anal Beauty (Tushy.com/Jules Jordan Video)
 2018: Greg Lansky
 2019: Greg Lansky
 2020: Jonni Darkko

 Director of the Year – Parody 
 2013: Axel Braun, Star Wars XXX (Axel Braun Productions/Vivid Entertainment)
 2014: Will Ryder, Grease XXX: A Parody (X-Play/Adam & Eve Pictures)
 2015: Will Ryder, Not the Jersey Boys XXX (X-Play/Pulse)
 2016: Axel Braun, Batman vs. Superman XXX: An Axel Braun Parody (Wicked Pictures)
 2017: Axel Braun, Suicide Squad XXX: An Axel Braun Parody (Wicked Pictures)

 Director of the Year - Web 
 2019: MissaX

 European/Foreign Director of the Year 
 2013: Max Candy
 2014: Herve Bodilis
 2015: Herve Bodilis
 2016: Rocco Siffredi
 2017: Rocco Siffredi
 2018: Dick Bush
 2019: Rocco Siffredi
 2020: Rocco Siffredi

 Emerging Studio 
 2007: Jules Jordan
 2008: Harmony Films

 Ethnic Release 
 2011: Black Ass Master 4 (Alexander DeVoe/Jules Jordan)

 European/Foreign Release 
 Feature Release of the Year 
 2012: Les Filles de la Campagne (Marc Dorcel/Wicked Pictures) 
 2013: Inglorious Bitches (Marc Dorcel/Wicked Pictures)
 2014: Claire Castel, The Chambermaid (Marc Dorcel)
 2015: Russian Institute: Lesson 19: Holidays at My Parents (Marc Dorcel)
 2016: How I Became a Sexual Slave (Marc Dorcel/Wicked Pictures)
 2017: My Daughter Is A Whore (Marc Dorcel/Wicked Pictures)
 2018: Revenge of a Daughter (Marc Dorcel/Wicked Pictures)
 2019: Misha in Exile (Evil Angel) 
 2020: The Heist (Jacquie et Michel)

 Non-Feature Release of the Year 
 2012: Slutty Girls Love Rocco 3 (Rocco Siffredi/Evil Angel)
 2013: Slutty Girls Love Rocco 4 (Rocco Siffredi/Evil Angel)
 2014: Cayenne Loves Rocco (Rocco Siffredi Productions/Evil Angel)
 2015: The Initiation of Alina Li (Harmony Films)
 2016: Do Not Disturb (Rebecca Lord Productions/Exile)
 2017: Rocco Siffredi Hard Academy 1 (Rocco Siffredi/Evil Angel)
 2018: Rocco's Perfect Slaves 11 (Rocco Siffredi/Evil Angel)
 2019: Rocco Siffreidi Hard Academy (Evil Angel)

 Executive Leadership Award 

 2009: Michael Klein (LFP, Inc.)
 2010: Mark Franks (Castle Megastore)

 Executive Leadership – Retail 
 2011: Theresa Flynt (Hustler Hollywood)

 Executive Leadership – Video 
 2011: Moose (Girlfriends Films)

 Executive Leadership – Web 
 2011: Brad Estes (Video Secrets) and Harmik Gharapetian (Epoch)
 2012: Gary Jackson (CCBill)

 Feature Director 
 2008: Dcypher

 Feature Movie of the Year 
 2008: Upload (SexZ Pictures)
 2009: Pirates II: Stagnetti's Revenge (Digital Playground)
 2010: The 8th Day (Adam & Eve Pictures)
 2011: Speed (Wicked Pictures)
 2012: Portrait of a Call Girl (Elegant Angel)
 2013: Wasteland (Elegant Angel)
 2014: Underworld (Wicked Pictures)
 2015: Wetwork (Vivid Entertainment)
 2016: Wanted (Wicked Pictures/Adam & Eve Pictures)
 2017: The Preacher's Daughter (Wicked Pictures)
 2018: Half His Age: A Teenage Tragedy (PureTaboo/Pulse)
 2019: Abigale (Tushy) 
 2020: No Mercy for Mankind (Digital Playground) 
 2021: Muse (Deeper) 

 Female Performer of the Year 

 2008: Eva Angelina
 2009: Jenna Haze
 2010: Tori Black
 2011: Andy San Dimas
 2012: Asa Akira
 2013: Brooklyn Lee
 2014: Riley Reid
 2015: Anikka Albrite
 2016: Dani Daniels
 2017: Katrina Jade
 2018: Romi Rain
 2019: Abigail Mac
 2020: Angela White
 2021: Emily Willis
 2022: Emily Willis

 Foreign Female Performer of the Year 

 2011: Katsuni
 2012: Anna Polina
 2013: Erica Fontes
 2014: Cayenne Klein
 2015: Misha Cross
 2016: Angela White
 2017: Valentina Nappi
 2018: Stella Cox
 2019: Ella Hughes
 2020: Luna Star 

 Girl/Girl Performer of the Year 
 2014: April O'Neil
 2015: Prinzzess
 2016: Vanessa Veracruz
 2017: Jenna Sativa (Spiegler)
 2018: Darcie Dolce
 2019: Charlotte Stokely
 2020: Charlotte Stokely
 2021: Scarlett Sage
 2022: Kenna James

 Feminist Porn 
 Release of the Year 
 2014: Occupied (Pink and White Productions)
 2015: San Francisco Lesbians (Trouble Films/Pink Velvet)

 Fetish 
 Fetish Release of the Year 
 2012: Odd Jobs 5 (Belladonna Entertainment/Evil Angel)
 2013: Fetish Fanatic 10 (Belladonna Entertainment/Evil Angel)
 2014: Samantha 38G & Friends 2 (Sensational Video)
 2015: To the Core (Mental Beauty/Girlfriends Films)
 2016: Comic Book Freaks and Cosplay Geeks (Burning Angel/Exile)
 2017: Lesbian Anal Sex Slaves 2 (Aiden Starr/Evil Angel)
 2018: Corrupted by the Evils of Fetish Porn (Severe Sex)
 2019: Mind Fucked: A Cult Classic (Severe Sex Films)

 Gonzo 
 Gonzo Director 
 2008: Jules Jordan

 Gonzo Release of the Year 
 2009: Performers of the Year (Elegant Angel)
 2010: Pornstar Workout (Elegant Angel)
 2011: Pornstar Workout (Elegant Angel)
 2012: Asa Akira Is Insatiable 2 (Elegant Angel)
 2013: Lexi (Elegant Angel)
 2014: Skin (Elegant Angel)
 2015: Ass Worship 15 (Jules Jordan Video)
 2016: Anikka’s Anal Sluts (BAM Visions/Evil Angel)
 2017: Mick Loves Anikka (BAM Visions/Evil Angel)
 2018: Inked Nation (Jules Jordan Video)
 2019: A XXX Documentary (PornFidelity)
 2020: Angela Loves Anal 2 (AGW Entertainment)

 Gonzo Release – Non-Feature 
 2011: Tori, Tarra and Bobbi Love Rocco (Rocco Siffredi/Evil Angel)

 Gonzo Series of the Year 
 2008: Jack's Playground (Digital Playground)
 2009: Performers of the Year (Evil Angel)
 2010: Big Tits Round Asses (Bang Productions)
 2011: Big Wet Asses (Elegant Angel)
 2012: Phat Bottom Girls (Manuel Ferrara/Evil Angel)
 2013: Ultimate Fuck Toy (Jules Jordan Video)
 2014: Internal Damnation (Jules Jordan Video)
 2015: Bang Bus (Bang Productions)
 2016: The Booty Movie (ArchAngel/Girlfriends Films)
 2017: Angela Loves... (AGW Entertainment/Girlfriends Films)
 2018: Angela Loves... (AGW Entertainment/Girlfriends Films)
 2019: True Anal... (TrueAnal.com)
 2020: Slut Puppies (Jules Jordan Video)

 Industry Contribution 
 2008: Sharon Mitchell
 2009: Phil Harvey (Adam & Eve)

 Interracial 
 Interracial Release of the Year 
 2011: Lex the Impaler 5 (Jules Jordan Video) 
 2012: Lex the Impaler 7 (Jules Jordan Video) 
 2013: Prince the Penetrator (Smash Pictures)
 2014: The Housewives of Lexington Steele (DreamZone Entertainment)
 2015: Dani Daniels Deeper (Blacked.com/Jules Jordan Video)
 2016: Carter Cruise Obsession (Blacked.com/Jules Jordan Video)
 2017: Interracial Orgies (Blacked.com/Jules Jordan Video)
 2018: Interracial Icon 5 (Blacked.com/Jules Jordan Video)

 Interracial Series 
 2012: Interracial Swingers (Devil's Film)
 2013: Mandingo Massacre (Jules Jordan Video)

 Latin-Themed 
 Latin-Themed Release of the Year 
 2012: Made in Xspana 7 (Nacho Vidal/Evil Angel)
 2013: Made in Xspana 8 (Nacho Vidal/Evil Angel)
 2014: Chongas 5 (Bang Productions)
 2015: Latinas on Fire 2 (Jules Jordan Video)
 2016: Colombian Fuckfest (Bang Productions)
 2017: Colombian Fuck Fest 4 (Bang Productions)
 2018: Nacho Loves Canela Skin (Nacho Vidal/Evil Angel)

 Latin-Themed Series 
 2012: Latin Adultery (Naughty America)
 2013: Latin Adultery (Naughty America/Pure Play Media)

 LGBT Awards 
The LGBT in the title refers to lesbian, gay, bisexual and transsexual people.

 Gay Web Company/Brand of the Year 
 2009: Maleflixxx.tv
 2010: Buddy Profits
 2011: Lucas Entertainment
 2012: Naked Sword
 2013: Dominic Ford
 2014: Next Door Entertainment/Buddy Profits
 2015: Next Door Entertainment/Buddy Profits
 2016: Cybersocket
 2017: NakedSword
 2018: NakedSword
 2019: Helix Studios

 Company 
 2005: Cybersocket
 2006: Cybersocket
 2007: Cybersocket
 2008: PrideBucks
 2009: Cybersocket

 Director of the Year 
 2008: Michael Lucas and Tony Dimarco
 2009: Ben Leon, Chris Ward and Tony Dimarco
 2010: Steven Scarborough
 2011: Joe Gage
 2012: Chris Ward
 2014: Jake Jaxson
 2015: Jake Jaxson
 2016: Joe Gage
 2017: mr. Pam
 2018: mr. Pam
 2019: Bruce LaBruce
2020: Julia Grandi

 Gay Feature Movie of the Year 
 2008: Link: The Evolution (Channel 1 Releasing)
 2009: To the Last Man (Raging Stallion Studios)
 2010: Focus/Refocus (Raging Stallion Studios)
 2011: Brutal (Raging Stallion Studios)
 2012: Assassin (Lucas Entertainment)
 2013: Incubus Parts 1 & 2 (Titan Media)
 2014: Original Sinners (Lucas Entertainment)
 2015: A Thing of Beauty (CockyBoys)
 2016: Answered Prayers (CockyBoys)
 2017: One Erection (CockyBoys)
 2018: MXXX: The Hardest Ride (NakedSword Originals)
 2019: Flea Pit (CockyBoys)

 Gay Performer of the Year 
 2008: Jake Deckard
 2009: Jackson Wild
 2010: (tie) Logan McCree and Tyler Saint
 2011: Spencer Reed
 2012: Adam Killian
 2013: Trenton Ducati
 2014: Jessy Ares
 2015: Landon Conrad
 2016: Rocco Steele
 2017: Sean Zevran
 2018: Colby Keller
 2019: Francois Sagat
 2020: Pierce Paris

 Gay Studio of the Year 
 2008: Titan Media
 2009: Titan Media
 2010: Titan Media
 2011: Titan Media 
 2012: Titan Media
 2013: Lucas Entertainment
 2014: CockyBoys
 2015: Bel Ami
 2016: CockyBoys
 2017: NakedSword Originals
 2018: NakedSword Originals
 2019: NakedSword Originals
 2020: NakedSword Originals

 Transsexual/Transgender Director of the Year 
 2012: Joey Silvera
 2013: Jay Sin
 2014: Joey Silvera
 2015: Joey Silvera
 2016: Joey Silvera
 2017: Nica Noelle
 2018: Dana Vespoli
 2019: Aiden Starr

 Transsexual/Transgender Performer of the Year 

 2010: Wendy Williams
 2011: Mia Isabella
 2012: Jesse Flores
 2013: Eva Lin
 2014: Venus Lux
 2015: Venus Lux
 2016: Jessy Dubai
 2017: Aubrey Kate
 2018: Chanel Santini
 2019: Chanel Santini

 Transsexual/Transgender Release of the Year 
 2010: My Girlfriend's Cock 5 (Red Light District Video)
 2011: America's Next Top Tranny: Season 6 (Goodfellas/Devil's Film)
 2012: She-male Police 2 (Joey Silvera/Evil Angel)
 2013: Mia Isabella: Want Some Honey? Vol. 2 (SMC Productions)
 2014: American She-Male X 5 (Joey Silvera Productions/Evil Angel)
 2015: Big Tit She-Male X 2 (Joey Silvera/Evil Angel)
 2016: Kaitlyn Gender: Based on a Not So True Story (Trans500/Pure Play)
 2017: Real Fucking Girls (Grooby Productions/Third World Media)
 2018: Buck Angel Superstar (TransSensual/Mile High)
 2019: Aubrey Kate Plus 8 (Evil Angel)

 Transsexual/Transgender Studio of the Year 
 2012: Grooby Productions
 2013: Third World Media
 2014: Trans 500
 2015: Evil Angel
 2016: Evil Angel
 2017: Grooby Productions
 2018: Grooby Productions
 2019: Trans Angels

 Live Cam Model of the Year 
 2016: Ashe Maree
 2017: Devious Angel
 2018: Jenny Blighe

 Male Performer of the Year 
 2008: Evan Stone
 2009: Manuel Ferrara
 2010: James Deen
 2011: Tommy Gunn
 2013: James Deen
 2014: James Deen
 2015: James Deen
 2016: Ryan Driller
 2017: Xander Corvus
 2018: Small Hands
 2019: Isiah Maxwell
 2020: Seth Gamble
 2021: Ramon Nomar

 Foreign Male Performer of the Year 
 2011: Rocco Siffredi 
 2012: Nacho Vidal
 2013: Toni Ribas
 2014: Danny D
 2015: Rocco Siffredi
 2016: Danny D
 2017: Jessy Jones
 2018: Steve Holmes
 2019: Steve Holmes
 2020: Danny D

 Marketing Campaign of the Year 
 2018: Vixen Angel of the Month/Year (Vixen.com)
 2019: Brazzers House (Brazzers)
 2020: I Am Riley (Evil Angel) 

 MILF Performer of the Year 
 2011: Lisa Ann
 2012: India Summer
 2013: Tanya Tate
 2014: Julia Ann
 2015: Kendra Lust
 2016: Kendra Lust
 2017: Cherie DeVille
 2018: Brandi Love
 2019: Bridgette B
 2020: Bridgette B
 2021: Cherie DeVille
 2022: Alexis Fawx

 Movie Production 
 2008: Gerard Damiano

 New Male Performer/Best Male Newcomer of the Year 
 2010: Dane Cross
 2011: Flash Brown
 2012: Xander Corvus
 2014: Tyler Nixon
 2016: Axel Aces
 2017: Wes Meadows (Vacated)<ref
name="xbizwinners2017"/>
 2018: Lucas Frost
 2019: Jason Luv
 2020: Pressure

 New Series of the Year 
 2013: Tonight's Girlfriend (Naughty America/Pure Play)

 Parody Release of the Year 
 Parody Release of the Year – Comedy 

 2010: Not the Bradys XXX: Marcia, Marcia (X-Play/Hustler Video)
 2012: Beverly Hillbillies XXX (X-Play/Adam & Eve)
 2013: Star Wars XXX: A Porn Parody (Axel Braun Productions/Vivid Entertainment)
 2014: Grease XXX: A Parody (X-Play/Adam & Eve)
 2015: Not the Jersey Boys XXX (X-Play/Pulse)

 Parody Release of the Year – Drama 
 2012: Top Guns (Digital Playground)
 2013: Inglorious Bitches (Marc Dorcel/Wicked Pictures)
 2014: Superman vs. Spider-Man: An Axel Braun Parody (Vivid Entertainment)
 2015: Cinderella XXX: An Axel Braun Parody (Wicked Pictures)
 2016: Batman v. Superman XXX: An Axel Braun Parody (Wicked Pictures)
 2017: Suicide Squad XXX: An Axel Braun Parody (Wicked Pictures)

 People's Choice Awards 
 Female Porn Star of the Year 
 2010: Teagan Presley

 Male Porn Star of the Year 
 2010: Tom Byron

 Best New Starlet of the Year 
 2010: Tanner Mayes

 Feature Movie of the Year 
 2010: The 8th Day (Adam & Eve)

 Gonzo Movie of the Year 
 2010: Tori Black is Pretty Filthy (Elegant Angel)
2020: My Name is Zaawaadi (Evil Angel)

 Porn Parody of the Year 
 2010: The Office: A XXX Parody (New Sensations)

 Porn Site of the Year 
 2010: Twistys.com

 Porn Studio of the Year 
 2010: Wicked Pictures

 Porn Director of the Year 
 2010: Will Ryder

 Web Babe of the Year 
 2010: Ariel Rebel

 Performer Comeback of the Year 
 2010: Dyanna Lauren
 2011: Dale DaBone
 2012: Prince Yahshua
 2013: Steven St. Croix

 Performer Showcase of the Year 
 2016: Jesse, Jesse: Alpha Female (Jules Jordan Video)
 2017: A.J. Applegate, The Booty Queen 2 (Arch Angel)
 2018: Katrina Jade, I Am Katrina (Evil Angel)
 2019: Abigail Mac, Abigail (Tushy)
 2020: Riley Reid, I Am Riley (Evil Angel) 

 Pleasure Products 
 Adult Game/Bachelorette Product of the Year 
 2014: Masturbating Midget-Man Wind-Up Doll (Pipedream Products)
 2015: 50 Positions of Bondage (Kheper Games)
 2016: Adult Charades, (Kheper Games)
 2017: Glow in the Dark Sex (Kheper Games)
 2018: Acts of Insanity (Kheper Games)
 2019: Mind, Body & Soul, Kheper Games

 Bachelor/Bachelorette Product of the Year 
 2016: SnorkelO (The Screaming O)
 2017: Donald Chump Love Doll (Pipedream Products)
 2018: Pet Cock Willy (It's the Bomb)
 2019: Sweet & Sexy Candy Posing Pouch, Hott Products

 BDSM Pleasure Products Company of the Year 
 2012: Sportsheets
 2013: XR Brands
 2014: Rapture Novelties
 2015: Sportsheets
 2016: The Stockroom
 2017: Sportsheets International
 2018: Cyrex
 2019: The Stockroom

 BDSM Soft Bondage Product/Line of the Year 
 2018: Fifty Shades Freed The Official Pleasure Collection (Lovehoney)
 2019: Enchanted Collection, Sportsheets

 Condom Manufacturer of the Year 
 2018: Paradise Marketing
 2019: Paradise Marketing

 Couples Sex Toy of the Year 
 2015: We-Vibe 4 Plus (Standard Innovation Corporation)
 2016: Passionate Play Collection (We-Vibe)
 2017: We-Vibe Sync (We-Vibe)
 2018: Pivot (We-Vibe)
 2019: Vac-U-Lock - Total Penetration Set, Doc Johnson

 Crossover Novelty Company 
 2011: The Screaming O

 Excellence in Product Packaging 
 2018: Jimmyjane
 2019: ZALO

 Fetish Product/Line of the Year 
 2014: Expandable Spreader Bar and Cuffs Set (Sportsheets)
 2015: Fetish Fantasy Series Lube Wrestling Ring (Pipedream Products)
 2016: Master Series (XR Brands)
 2017: Master Series (XR Brands)
 2018: Kink (Doc Johnson)
 2019: Master Series, XR Brands

 Innovative Product of the Year 
 2004: StatsRemote
 2005: Members Area System (Mansion Productions LLC)
 2010: Real Touch (AEBN)

 Innovative Sex Toy of the Year – Design 
 2016: Form 5 (Jimmyjane)
 2017: Nova (We-Vibe)
 2018: Mimic (Clandestine Devices)
 2019: Satisfyer Pro Traveler, Satisfyer

 Innovative Sex Toy of the Year – Technology 
 2016: Womanizer, epi24
 2017: Technology Womanizer Pro40 (epi24)
 2018: The Fleshlight Launch (Kiiroo)
 2019: Lovely 0, Lovely

 LGBT Pleasure Products Company of the Year 
 2016: Spareparts Hardwear
 2017: OxBalls
 2018: Perfect Fit Brand
 2019: OXBALLS

 LGBT/Gay/Lesbian Sex Toy/Line of the Year 
 2013: Fleshjack (Fleshlight)
 2014: American Bombshell B-10 Warhead (Doc Johnson)
 2015: Jock Armout (Perfect Fit Brand)
 2016: Fleshjack (Fleshlight)
 2017: Tom of Finland (XR Brands)
 2018: Sackjack (Oxballs)
 2019: (Gay) Milan Christopher Dildo Fleshjack, Fleshlight

 Lingerie/Apparel Collection of the Year 
 2013: Fetish Fantasy Lingerie (Pipedream Products)
 2014: Signature Collection (Rene Rofe)
 2015: After Dark (Baci Lingerie)
 2016: Curve (Fantasy Lingerie)
 2017: Baci Dreams (Baci Lingerie)
 2018: Ariane (Coco de Mer)
 2019: Adore, Allure Lingerie

 Lingerie/Apparel Company of the Year 
 2011: Baci Lingerie
 2012: Baci Lingerie
 2013: Hustler Lingerie
 2014: Dreamgirl International
 2015: Magic Silk
 2016: Coquette
 2017: Magic Silk
 2018: Baci Lingerie
 2019: Baci Lingerie

 Luxury Pleasure Product/Line of the Year 
 2018: Mimic (Clandestine Devices)
 2019: Premium, Womanizer

 Luxury Brand of the Year 
 2018: Le Wand
 2019: LELO

 Male Pleasure Products Company of the Year 
 2016: Perfect Fit Brand
 2017: Fleshlight International
 2018: Sir Richard's
 2019: Satisfyer Men Heat Vibration, Satisfyer

 Male Sex Toy/Line of the Year 
 2012: Hand Solo (Rocks-Off)
 2013: Helix Syn (Aneros)
 2014: Flight Pilot (Fleshlight)
 2015: Pulse II (Hot Octopuss)
 2016: CyberSkin Twerking Butt (Topco Sales)
 2017: BLEWIT (blewit!)
 2018: Pulse III (Hot Octopuss)

 Marketing Campaign of the Year 
 2018: New Generation (Satisfyer)
 2019: System JO 5th Anniversary

 New Pleasure Products Company of the Year 
 2012: Wet For Her
 2013: Masque
 2014: BodiSpa
 2015: Kiiroo
 2016: Shots America
 2017: b-Vibe
 2018: Clandestine Devices
 2019: Rock Candy Toys

 Novelty/Sex Toy Company of the Year 
 2006: Doc Johnson
 2007: California Exotic Novelties LLC
 2008: PHS International
 2012: BMS Factory
 2013: Fun Factory
 2014: Standard Innovation Corporation

 Pleasure Products Company of the Year – Boutique 
 2018: Hot Octopuss
 2019: Clandestine Devices

 Pleasure Products Company of the Year – Full Range 
 2011: Cobra Libre (Fun Factory USA)
 2012: Pipedream Products
 2013: LELO
 2014: Lovehoney
 2015: LELO
 2016: California Exotic Novelties
 2017: Doc Johnson'
 2018: Doc Johnson
 2019: CalExotics

 Pleasure Products Company of the Year – International 
 2012: Shunga
 2015: Fun Factory
 2016: Fun Factory
 2017: Fun Factory
 2018: Lovehoney
 2019: Lovehoney

 Pleasure Products Company of the Year – Progressive 
 2018: Dame Products
 2019: COTR

 Pleasure Products Company of the Year – Sex Toys 
 2016: We-Vibe
 2017: Fun Factory
 2018: Satisfyer
 2019: Blush Novelties

 Sensual Accessory Product/Line of the Year 
 2018: Nipple Play, CalExotic
 2019: Desir Metallique, Bijoux Indiscrets

 Sensual Bath & Body Product of the Year 
 2018: Naturals Sensual Massage Oil (Kama Sutra)
 2019: Crystal Massage Oil - Amethyst Sweet Almond, Exsens

 Sex Doll Brand of the Year 
 2019: Ultimate Fantasy Dolls, Pipedream Products

 Sex Enhancement Product of the Year 
 2018: Ginger Litchi Arousal Gel (Exsens)
 2019: Pleasure, Foria

 Sex Lubricant of the Year 
 2018: Silver Studio Collection (Sliquid)
 2019: pjur med Soft glide, pjur

 Sex Lubricant Company of the Year 
 2018: Sliquid
 2019: Wet Lubricants

 Sex Toy of the Year – Powered/Vibrating 
 2014: nü Sensuelle Impulse
 2015: Hula Beads (LELO)
 2016: Magic Wand Rechargeable, (Vibratex)
 2017: Pro Penguin (Satisfyer)
 2018: Touch Extreme Vibrations (Nasstoys)
 2019: Tri-It, Screaming O

 Sex Toy of the Year – Powered/Non-Vibrating 
 2018: Womanizer 2GO, (Womanizer)
 2019: Stronic Surf Pulsator 2, Fun Factory

 Sex Toy of the Year – Non-Powered 
 2014: Ceramix Pleasure Pottery No. 4 (Pipedream)
 2015: D.1 Stone (Laid)
 2016: Icicles Gold G1, (Pipedream Products)
 2017: King Cock Plus (Pipedream Products)
 2018: Chrystalino Treasure, (Shots America)
 2019: Trident Series, Aneros

 Sexual Health and Wellness Brand of the Year 
 2018: pjur Group USA
 2019: Sliquid

 Sexual Health and Wellness Product of the Year 
 2018: Fun Cup (Fun Factory)
 2019: Menstrual Cups, Jimmyjane

 Specialty Pleasure Product/Line of the Year 
 2014: Hydromax (Bathmate)
 2015: Bubble Love (Bubble Love)
 2016: Clone-A-Willy Plus Balls Kit (Empire Labs)
 2017: Buck-OFF - Buck Angel FTM Stroker (Perfect Fit Brand)
 2018: Warm, (Warm)
 2019: Touch, Warm

 Star Branded 
 2012: Fleshlight Girls/Lisa Ann (Fleshlight) 
 2013: James Deen Signature Collection (Doc Johnson)

 Toy Manufacturer of the Year 
 2010: Pipedream Products
 2011: California Exotic Novelties

 Retail and Distribution/Wholesale 
 Home Party Company of the Year 
 2018: Bedroom Kandi
 2019: Pure Romance

 Retailer of the Year 
 2009: Castle Megastores
 2010: Hustler Hollywood
 2011: Castle Megastores

 Retailer of the Year – Boutique 
 2011: Good Vibrations
 2012: The Pleasure Chest
 2013: Good Vibrations
 2014: Coco de Mer
 2015: Good Vibrations
 2016: Good Vibrations
 2017: The Pleasure Chest
 2018: Feelmore Adult Gallery
 2019: The Pleasure Chest

 Retailer of the Year – Chain 
 2012: Adam & Eve
 20:13 Peekay
 2014: Castle Megastore
 2015: Adam & Eve
 2016: Lion's Den
 2017: Hustler Hollywood
 2018: Good Vibrations
 2019: Adam & Eve Stores

 Retailer of the Year – Progressive 
 2018: Hustler Hollywood
 2019: Hustler Hollywood

 Online Retailer of the Year – Full Range 
 2013: Adam & Eve
 2014: Adam & Eve
 2015: Adam & Eve
 2016: Adam & Eve
 2017: AdamEve.com
 2018: AdamEve.com
 2019: AdamEve.com

 Online Retailer of the Year – Pleasure Products 
 2013: Eden Fantasys
 2014: Fleshlight.com
 2015: LoveHoney.com
 2016: LoveHoney.com
 2017: LoveHoney.com
 2018: Lovehoney.com
 2019: Lovehoney.com

 Online Retailer of the Year – Specialty 
 2018: Stockroom.com
 2019: UnboundBabes.com

 Retail Education/Training Program of the Year 
 2018: The CalExotics Institute, CalExotics
 2019: Williams Trading University

 Wholesaler/Distributor of the Year – Full Range 
 2011: IVD/East Coast News
 2012: Eldorado
 2013: International Video Distributors/East Coast News
 2014: International Video Distributors/East Coast News
 2015: IVD/East Coast News

 Wholesaler/Distributor of the Year – International 
 2013: Pink Cherry Wholesale
 2014: Eropartner Distribution
 2015: Scala Playhouse
 2016: Eropartner Distribution
 2017: Shots Media
 2018: Eropartner Distribution
 2019: Shots Media

 Wholesaler/Distributor of the Year – Pleasure Products 
 2013: Entrenue
 2014: Eldorado
 2015: Eldorado Trading Company
 2016: Eldorado Trading Company
 2017: Eldorado Co.
 2018: Eldorado Trading Co.
 2019: Eldorado Trading Company

 Wholesaler/Distributor of the Year – Progressive 
 2018: Williams Trading Co.
 2019: Nalpac

 Wholesaler/Distributor of the Year – Specialty 
 2011: Stockroom
 2012: Paradise Marketing
 2013: Paradise Marketing
 2014: Entrenue
 2015: XGEN Products
 2016: XGEN Products
 2017: Entrenue
 2018: Xgen Products
 2018: Xgen Products

 Screenplay of the Year 
 2011: Nic Andrews, Rawhide 2: Dirty Deeds, (Adam & Eve Pictures)
 2012: Graham Travis, Portrait of a Call Girl (Elegant Angel)
 2013: Jacky St. James, Torn (New Sensations)
 2014: Jacky St. James, The Temptation of Eve (New Sensations)
 2015: Mark Logan, Wetwork (Vivid Entertainment)
 2016: Jacky St. James, The Submission of Emma Marx 2: Boundaries (New Sensations)
 2017: Brad Armstrong, The Preacher's Daughter (Wicked Pictures)
 2018: The Submission of Emma Marx: Evolved (New Sensations)
 2019: Abigail (Tushy)

 Sexpert of the Year 
 2016: Dr. Jess
 2017: Jessica Drake
 2018: Dr. Chris Donaghue
 2019: Dr. Emily Morse

 Sexual Health, Wellness and Enhancement 
 Sex Enhancement Product of the Year 
 2017: Crazy Girl Oral Sex Gel (Classic Erotica)

 Sexual Health and Wellness Brand of the Year 
 2017: JO

 Sexual Health and Wellness Product of the Year 
 2017: Lovelife krush (OhMiBod)

 Special Honorees 
 Advocate of the Year 
 2006: Greg Piccionelli

 ASACP Service Recognition Award 
The ASACP in the title refers to Association of Sites Advocating Child Protection:
 2007: Greg Piccionelli
 2009: Stormy Daniels, Tera Patrick and Evan Seinfeld 
 2010: Joel Hall (Epoch)
 2011: Scott Rabinowitz (CyberStampede) and John Van Arnham
 2012: Rodney Thompson (Cyber Stampede)
 2013: Marc Randazza (Randazza Legal Group)

 Businessman of the Year 
 2006: Joe Lensman (Adult.com)
 2007: Kevin Ho (TopBucks/Pink Visual)
 2009: Ben Jelloun (Metro)
 2010: Ilan Bunimovitz (Private Media Group/GameLink)

 Businesswoman of the Year 
 2006: Jenna Jameson
 2007: Samantha Lewis (Digital Playground)
 2010: Allison Vivas (Pink Visual/TopBucks)

 Eros Progressive Business 
 2011: Angelo Abela (Sexyland)
 2012: Windsor Wholesale Australia & Swiss Navy
 2013: Rob Godwin (Sexpo International, Australia)

 FSC Award 
 2010: Girlfriends Films

 FSC Leadership 
 2009: Kink.com
 2011: Colin Rountree (Wasteland.com)
 2012: Allison Vivas (Pink Visual)
 2013: Amnon (Met-Art.com)

 FSC Netizen 
 Honorary Legal 
 2007: Jeffrey J. Douglas

 Industry Achievement 
 2004: Larry Flynt

 Industry Humanitarian Award 
 2010: Steve Bryson (OrbitalPay)

 Industry Icon 
 2012: Larry Flynt (Hustler)

 Industry Innovator 
 2012: Steve Shubin (Fleshlight)

 Industry Leadership Award 
 2017: Eric Paul Leue (Free Speech Coalition)

 Industry Pioneer 
 2009: Ron Levi (CE Cash)

 Industry Pioneer Award – Movies and Production 
 2016: Ken Guarino, Metro
 2017: Kelly Holland (Penthouse)
 2018: Ted Blitt, Mile High Media

 Industry Pioneer Award – Novelty/Pleasure Products 
 2012: Ron Braverman (Doc Johnson)
 2014: Nick Orlandino (Pipedream Products)
 2016: Martin Tucker (Topco Sales)
 2017: Shay and Dan Martin (Vibratex)
 2018: Dennis Paradise, Paradise Marketing

 Industry Pioneer Award – Retail and Distribution 
 2012: Mark Franks (Castle Megastore)
 2014: Morton Hyatt (Komar Company)
 2016: Ralph Caplan (Nalpac)
 2017: Larry Garland (Eldorado)
 2018: Robert Pyne Sr., Williams Trading Co.

 Industry Pioneer Award – Video 
 2010: John Stagliano (Evil Angel)
 2011: Patrick Collins (Elegant Angel)

 Industry Pioneer Award – Web and Technology 
 2010: Greg Clayman and Chuck Tsiamis (VideoSecrets)
 2012: Kim Nielsen (ATKingdom)
 2014: György Gattyán (Adult Webmaster Empire)
 2016: Ilan Bunimovitz (GameLink.com)
 2017: Ron Cadwell (CCBill)
 2018: Karl Bernard, Gamma Entertainment

 Industry Service Award 
 2016: Tim Henning (ASACP)

 Lifetime Achievement 
 2004: Larry Flynt
 2011: Michael Moran (Lion's Den)

 Man of the Year 
 2008: Marc Bell (Penthouse)
 2011: John Stagliano (Evil Angel)
 2012: Dan O'Connell (Girlfriends Films)

 Outstanding Achievement 
 2008: IMLive 
 2008: PussyCash

 Special Memorial 
 2009: Frank Cadwell, Joann Cadwell

 Specialty Release of the Year 
 2012: Jessica Drake's Guide to Wicked Sex: Anal Edition (Wicked Pictures)
 2013: Adam & Eve's Guide to the Kama Sutra (Adam & Eve Pictures)
 2014: Kama Sutra (Marc Dorcel)
 2015: Jessica Drake's Guide to Wicked Sex: Plus Size (Wicked Pictures)
 2016: Amazing Sex Secrets: Better Orgasms (Adam & Eve Pictures)
 2017: Nina Hartley's Guide to Exploring Open Relationships (Adam & Eve Pictures)

 Studio of the Year 
 2006: Digital Playground
 2007: Digital Playground
 2008: Evil Angel
 2009: Digital Playground
 2010: Jules Jordan Video
 2011: Digital Playground 
 2012: Elegant Angel
 2013: New Sensations
 2014: Evil Angel
 2015: Hard X
 2016: Evil Angel
 2017: Evil Angel
 2018: Vixen/Tushy/Blacked
 2019: Gamma Films
 2020: Gamma Entertainment

 European/Foreign Studio 
 2011: Marc Dorcel
 2012: Marc Dorcel
 2013: Marc Dorcel
 2014: Marc Dorcel
 2015: Marc Dorcel
 2016: Marc Dorcel
 2017: Marc Dorcel
 2018: Harmony Films
 2019: Marc Dorcel
 2020: Marc Dorcel

 Feature Studio 
 2011: Wicked Pictures

 Fetish Studio 
 2012: Kink.com

 Gonzo Studio 
 2011: Elegant Angel
 2012: Jules Jordan Video

 New Studio 
 2010: Sweet Sinner
 2013: Hard Candy Films
 2015: Airerose Entertainment
 2016: ArchAngel
 2017: Vixen.com
 2018: PureTaboo.com
 2020: Deeper

 Parody Studio 
 2011: New Sensations
 2012: Hustler Video

 Taboo 
 Taboo Release of the Year 
 2018: The Stepmother 15 (Sweet Sinner/Mile High)
 2019: Future Darkly: Artifamily (Pure Taboo/Gamma Films)
 2020: The Gold Star: A Whitney Wright Story, (Pure Taboo)

 Vignette 
 Vignette Release of the Year 
 2012: Office Perverts 6 (Reality Junkies/Mile High Media)
 2013: Allie Haze: True Sex (Vivid Entertainment)
 2014: Busty Beauties Car Wash (Hustler Video)
 2015: Entrapments (Forbidden Fruits Films/Exile)
 2016: A Hotwife Blindfolded 2 (New Sensations)
 2017: The Proposal (New Sensations)
 2018: Sun-Lit (TrenchcoatX.com/Jules Jordan Video)
 2019: After Dark (Vixen)
 2020: Sordid Stories (Deeper)

 Vignette Series of the Year 
 2012: Bus Stop Girls (Smash Pictures)
 2013: Tonight's Girlfriend (Naughty America/Pure Play)
 2014: Tonight's Girlfriend (Naughty America/Pure Play)
 2015: Tonight's Girlfriend (Naughty America/Pure Play)
 2016: Tonight's Girlfriend (Naughty America/Pure Play)
 2017: Barely Legal (Hustler Video)
 2018: First Anal (Tushy.com/Jules Jordan Video)
 2019: Blacked Raw V (Blacked)
 2020: Blacked Raw'' (Blacked)

Web and Tech

CPA Network of the Year 
 2018: CrakRevenue

Dating Company of the Year 
 2018: Adult FriendFinder
 2019: Adult FriendFinder

Emerging Web Brand of the Year 
 2018: FuckingAwesome.com
 2019: Nutaku

Innovative Web/Tech Company of the Year 
 2010: RedLightCenter.com

Innovative Web/Tech Product of the Year 
 2011: AdultCentro
 2012: PVLocker.com (Pink Visual)
 2013: WebcamWiz
 2014: MyFreeSexStore
 2015: ModelCentro
 2016: CamBuilder (Streamate)
 2017: MyPorn.com
 2018: FanCentro
 2019: PumaPay

Marketing Campaign of the Year (Web) 
 2018: Traffic Pimps
 2019: ManyVids

Mobile Company of the Year 
 2018: BitterStrawberry

Payment Services Company of the Year – IPSP 
 2018: Epoch
 2019: SegPay

Payment Services Company of the Year – Merchant Services 
 2018: NETBilling
 2019: MobiusPay

Payment Services Company of the Year – Alternative 
 2018: Paxum
 2019: Paxum

Progressive Web Company/Brand of the Year 
 2018: iWantEmpire
 2019: JuicyAds

Software Company of the Year 
 2008: Mansion Productions LLC 
 2009: Too Much Media
 2010: 2Much.net
 2011: Too Much Media 
 2012: Elevated X
 2013: Mansion Productions
 2014: ElevatedX
 2015: ElevatedX

Traffic Company of the Year – North America 
 2018: TrafficJunky
 2019: ExoClick

Traffic Company of the Year – Europe 
 2018: TrafficStars

VOD Company of the Year 
 2018: AEBN
 2019: Erotik.com

Web Host of the Year 
 2003: Mach10 Hosting
 2004: Webair
 2005: Split Infinity
 2006: Split Infinity
 2007: National Net
 2008: Webair
 2009: MojoHost
 2010: Cavecreek
 2011: MojoHost 
 2012: MojoHost
 2013: MojoHost
 2014: MojoHost
 2015: MojoHost
 2016: MojoHost
 2017: MojoHost
 2018: MojoHost
 2019: MojoHost

Web Solutions Company of the Year 
 2018: ModelCentro " />
 2019: ModelCentro

Web Performances/Shows

Cam Company of the Year – North America 
 2018: Chaturbate
 2019: BongaCams

Cam Company of the Year – Europe 
 2018: ImLive

Cam Model of the Year – Female (Studio & Independent) 
 2018: Jenny Blighe
 2019: (Studio) Kendra Summer
 2019: (Independent) Emily Bloom
2020: (Independent) Bunny Marthy

Cam Model of the Year – Male 
 2018: Ethan Joy
 2019: Brock Cooper

Cam Site of the Year – North America 
 2018: MyFreeCams.com
 2019: MyFreeCams.com

Cam Site of the Year – Europe 
 2018: Jasmin.com

Cam Site of the Year – Gay 
 2018: Flirt4Free.com
 2019: Chaturbate.com

Cam Studio of the Year – Europe 
 Studio 20
 Studio 20

Cam Studio of the Year – Latin America 
 2018: AJ Studios

Clip Artist of the Year - Female 
 2019: Reya Sunshine

Clip Artist of the Year - Male 
 2019: Wesley Woods

Clip Site of the Year 
 2019: ManyVids.com

Web Babe/Web Star of the Year 
 2008: Sunny Leone
 2009: Trisha Uptown
 2010: Jelena Jensen
 2011: Gisele
 2012: Vicky Vette
 2013: Vicky Vette
 2014: Evelyn Cates
 2015: Ariel Rebel
 2016: Kendra Sunderland
 2017: Harriet Sugarcookie
 2018: Catjira
 2019: Natasha Nice

Web Show of the Year 
 2005: RainMaker

Websites

Adult Site of the Year – Paysite – Multi-Genre 
 2007: TheBestPorn.com 
 2012: VideoBox.com
 2013: BangBros.com
 2014: 21Sextury.com
 2015: Brazzers.com
 2018: PornDoePremium.com
 2019: Brazzers.com

Adult Site of the Year – BDSM 
 2014: DivineBitches.com
 2015: Kink.com
 2016: Kink.com
 2017: Kink.com
 2018: Kink.com
 2019: Kink.com

Adult Site of the Year – Clips 
 2018: ManyVids.com

Adult Site of the Year – Erotic 
 2015: X-Art.com
 2016: SexArt.com
 2017: NubileFilms.com
 2018: X-Art.com
 2019: Babes.com

Adult Site of the Year – Fan Site 
 2015: FreeOnes.com
 2016: WoodRocket.com
 2017: IAFD.com
 2018: IAFD.com
 2019: FreeOnes.com

Adult Site of the Year – Female Produced 
 2019: XConfessions.com

Adult Site of the Year – Fetish 
 2014: Clips4Sale.com

Adult Site of the Year – For Women 
 2016: XConfessions.com
 2017: Sssh.com

Adult Site of the Year – Gay 
 2011: CorbinFisher.com 
 2012: HotHouse.com
 2013: BelAmiOnline.com
 2014: BelAmiOnline.com
 2015: CockyBoys.com
 2016: BelAmiOnline.com
 2017: CockyBoys.com
 2018: CockyBoys.com
 2019: CockyBoys.com

Adult Site of the Year – MILF 
 2011: Kelly Madison

Adult Site of the Year – Niche 
 2015: Blacked.com
 2016: Blacked.com
 2017: Tushy.com

Adult Site of the Year – Photography 
 2013: Twistys.com
 2014: HollyRandall.com
 2015: MetArt.com
 2016: HollyRandall.com
 2017: MetArt.com
 2018: MetArt.com
 2019: MetArt.com

Adult Site of the Year – Performer 
 2010: EvaAngelinaXXXX.com
 2011: ToriBlack.com
 2012: SunnyLeone.com
 2013: AlexisTexas.com
 2014: VickyAtHome.com
 2015: AngelaWhite.com
 2016: AngelaWhite.com
 2017: JamesDeen.com
 2018: ReidMyLips.com
 2019: SinsLife.com (Johnny & Kissa Sins)

Adult Site of the Year – Retail 
 2006: Sextoy.com
 2007: WantedList
 2008: Adam & Eve
 2009: Stockroom.com
 2010: Fleshlight
 2011: SexToy.com
 2012: Adam & Eve

Adult Site of the Year – Solo/All-Girl 
 2011: Met-Art.com
 2012: AbbyWinters.com
 2018: Girlsway.com
 2019: Girlsway.com

Adult Site of the Year – Specialty/Alternative 
 2013: Kink.com
 2014: (tie) Kink.com and CrashPadSeries.com
 2015: Sssh.com
 2016: CrashPadSeries.com
 2017: CrashPadSeries.com
 2018: TrenchcoatX.com

Adult Site of the Year – Studio 
 2011: EvilAngel.com
 2012: NaughtyAmerica.com
 2013: NaughtyAmerica.com
 2014: Brazzers.com
 2015: EvilAngel.com
 2016: EvilAngel.com
 2017: EvilAngel.com
 2018: EvilAngel.com
 2019: EvilAngel.com

Adult Site of the Year – Trans 
 2012: WendyWilliamsXXX.com
 2013: TrannyBox.com
 2014: EvaLinXXX.com
 2015: Shemale.xxx
 2016: Trans500.com
 2017: ShemaleYum.com
 2018: GroobyGirls.com
 2019: GroobyGirls.com

Adult Site of the Year – Video/VOD 
 2016: Brazzers.com
 2017: Vixen.com
 2018: AdultEmpire.com
 2019: AdultEmpire.com

Adult Site of the Year – Virtual Reality 
 2016: BadoinkVR.com
 2017: NaughtyAmerica.com
 2018: WankzVR.com
 2019: WankzVR.com

Woman of the Year 
 2008: Diane Duke (Free Speech Coalition)
 2009: Lori Z (The Adult Broker)
 2011: Allison Vivas (Pink Visual)
 2012: Diane Duke (Free Speech Coalition)

References

External links 

 
 2009 "XBIZ Awards Winners Announced"
 "2012 XBIZ Award Winners"
 "2013 XBIZ Award Winners Announced"
 "Porn's XBiz Awards an uninhibited affair"

American pornographic film awards
Awards established in 2003

de:XBIZ#XBIZ Awards